Kosmos 426 ( meaning Cosmos 426), also known as DS-U2-K No.1, was a Soviet satellite which was launched in 1971 as part of the Dnepropetrovsk Sputnik programme. It was a  spacecraft, which was built by the Yuzhnoye Design Bureau, and was used to study charged particles and radiation in the Earth's magnetosphere.

Launch 
A Kosmos-3M carrier rocket, with serial number 65014-101, was used to launch Kosmos 426 into low Earth orbit. The launch took place from Site 132/2 at the Plesetsk Cosmodrome. The launch occurred at 18:10:00 UTC on 4 June 1971, and resulted in the successful insertion of the satellite into orbit.

Orbit 
Upon reaching orbit, the satellite was assigned its Kosmos designation, and received the International Designator 1971-052A. The North American Aerospace Defense Command assigned it the catalogue number 05281.

Kosmos 426 was the only DS-U2-K satellite to be launched. It was operated until 12 January 1972, and subsequently remained in orbit until it decayed and reentered the atmosphere on 11 May 2002.

See also 

 1971 in spaceflight

References 

1971 in spaceflight
Kosmos satellites
Spacecraft launched in 1971
Dnepropetrovsk Sputnik program